Admiral Luce may refer to:

David Luce (1906–1971), British Royal Navy admiral
John Luce (Royal Navy officer) (1870–1932), British Royal Navy rear admiral
Stephen Luce (1827–1917), U.S. Navy admiral

See also
Martin Lucey (1920–1992), British Royal Navy rear admiral